United Nations Security Council resolution 960, adopted unanimously on 21 November 1994, after reaffirming Resolution 782 (1992) and all subsequent resolutions on Mozambique, the Council welcomed and endorsed the recent elections on  27–29 October 1994 in accordance with the Rome General Peace Accords, noting a declaration that they were free and fair by the Special Representative of the Secretary-General.

The Council called upon the Mozambican parties to accept the results, of which Joaquim Chissano of FRELIMO was elected, and to continue the process of national reconciliation on a system of multi-party democracy and observe democratic principles. All Member States and international organisations were urged to contribute to the reconstruction of Mozambique.

See also
 Elections in Mozambique
 History of Mozambique
 List of United Nations Security Council Resolutions 901 to 1000 (1994–1995)

References

External links
 
Text of the Resolution at undocs.org

 0960
1994 in Mozambique
Mozambican Civil War
 0960
November 1994 events